The Davis D-1 is an American light two-seat parasol-winged monoplane of the late 1920s.

Development and design
The Davis D-1 was developed from the Davis V-3, which in turn was developed from the Vulcan American Moth. The Davis Aircraft Corporation had its factory at Richmond, Indiana. The D-1 is a parasol-winged aircraft of mixed construction with a two-spar wing and a rectangular welded steel-tube fuselage, the whole being covered by fabric. There are tandem open cockpits and it is fitted with a fixed tailwheel undercarriage which is attached by struts to the fuselage top and bottom. The wing is braced by struts from the lower fuselage. Various engines of between  have been fitted.

Operational history

The D-1 was used from 1929 by sporting pilots and by private pilot owners for leisure flying. In September 1930, Art Chester bought a Davis D-1-85 parasol, and flew it to victory in the 1930 National Air Races. A late model D-1W "The Whistler II" was built in 1933 for Davis with a canopy. It was raced in the 1934 Miami air race by Art Davis winning the category at 133.478 mph. It was later owned by movie star Richard Arlen, and restored to become a Grand Champion antique.

Most Davis aircraft were sold in the United States but at least one went to Argentina. Fourteen examples remained in 2001 in various states of airworthiness and several are still airworthy in 2011.

Variants
(Data from Aerofiles)
D-1   LeBlond 5D (23 built)  
D-1-166   LeBlond 5DF (4 built)
D-1-K   Kinner K-5 (10-15 built)
D-1-L  prototype of the D-1-166 with  Lambert R-266 (1 built - also known as D-1-85) 

D-1-W   Warner Scarab (8 converted from D-1-K)

Specifications (D-1-W)

Notes

References

Green, William, The Aircraft of the World, 1965, MacDonald & Co (Publishers) Ltd, no isbn
Simpson, R.W., Airlife's World Aircraft, Airlife Publishing Ltd, 2001,

External links

Information and photographs of the D-1 series (Sourced from Aerofiles)

1920s United States civil utility aircraft
Parasol-wing aircraft
Single-engined tractor aircraft